Actinocatenispora thailandica is a bacterium from the genus Actinocatenispora which has been isolated from soil in Thailand.

References 

Micromonosporaceae
Bacteria described in 2006